Artscape is an annual art festival held in the Mount Royal neighborhood of Baltimore, Maryland in July. Since its first annual event in 1982, it has become the largest free arts festival in America. It has boasted acts such as Ray Charles, Aretha Franklin, and Matisyahu in the past, attracting over 350,000 people from the city, and surrounding areas. Film programming during Artscape is provided by Maryland Film Festival. There are artists in a variety of visual and performing media. Events are free and open to the public.

Funding
According to Artscape, 43% of the funding for 2010's event came from sponsorships and contributions, while 29% came from concession income, the remaining funds came from fundraising, and grants.  The report states that about 18% of their expenses in 2010 went to administrative costs, 3% to fundraising activities, while the majority 79% went to program expenses.
 Artscape organizers estimate that the total economic impact for the City of Baltimore in 2010 was $25.97 million. It is reported that 2009 attendees spend $9,256,046 with Artscape vendors.

Programs
Artscape includes various programs and artwork displays, including juried exhibitions, installations, literary arts, visual arts, and performances. Musical performances take place at various stages across Baltimore. Past notable musical performers have included Aretha Franklin (1994), Al Green (2003), and Isaac Hayes (2004), among others.

Musical line-up

2016
BGE Main Stage
Wyclef Jean
Burning Spear
The Mighty Mighty Bosstones
Jah Works
Spirit Blues
Chelsey Green and the Green Project
Of Tomorrow
Foggy May
8 Ohms Band
Tropik Sol
Bond Street District
Reggie Wayne Morris
Thurgood Marshall Band
Aztec Soul
Johns Hopkins University Station North Stage 
Baltimore City Public Schools' Young Audiences Summer Arts and Learning Academies
Hotline
F featuring Landis Expandis
Parks Landing
The Henchmen
Prince Dance Party featuring Wendel Patrick & DJ Dubble8, DJ Sam Burns
Modern Nomad
Fake Flowers Real Dirt
Lost Keys
Surf Harp
Weekends
Sun Club
Bmore Does Bowie (featuring Aguierre’s Dogs, Scroll Downers, Ed Schrader's Music Beat, SYS Band and The Band that Fell to Earth)
Milestones
Scroll Downers
Expert Alterations
Chiffon
Bmore Beatscape hosted by Eze Jackson
Morgan State University Sound Off Live Stage
Michele McTierney
Coexist Music Group and Devin Jano
Spaceboy
DBS
Rumba Club
David Bach
The Coldspring Jazz Quartet
Orchester Prazevica
Gotham Theory
Greenspan
Naked Jungle
Dunson
Michael Raitzyk Quartet
Tongue in Cheek
High-Brid Band
Essential Vybe
The Palovations
Edjacated Phools

2015
George Clinton & Parliament Funkadelic
The Reverend Peyton's Big Damn Band
Michael Franti & Spearhead
Trombone Shorty & Orleans Avenue
Martian Architect
Slow Lights
Reve
Purple Orange
Inde
Kanika
Goat
Subtle Hustle
Quinton Randall
10 Step Groove
The Upstarters
D.T. Huber
9 Mile Roots
The Slanted Sound
Hollywood Banks

2014
MEA Energy Stage
Anthony Hamilton
Sharon Jones & The Dap-Kings
Ozomatli
Galactic
Carl Filipiak
Emily King
Nadine Ray & The Allstars
Kelly Bell Band
Joe Cooper Project
By & By
Sweet Leda
The Crawdaddies
May Weather
Kevin Jackson
Station North Stage
The Players Band
All Mighty Senators
Baltimore City Public Schools
Blind Man Leading
Brooks Long and the Mad Dog No Good
Bobby E Lee & The Sympathizers
Small Apartments
8 Ohms Band
Skydivers
Wyoming Exploding
Deaf Scene
Andy Poxon
Bosley
Super City
Connor Brendan Band
Among Wolves
The Festival Stage
Tom Principato
Cowboy Mouth
The Glenmont Popes
Yellow Dubmarine
Reverend Horton Heat
Blizz
Mystic Warriors
T.K. Blue
Evokatones
Muddy Crows
Eureka Birds
Honest Haloway
Plurals
Lotus Song & The Black Light Asylum
Voodoo Pharmacology
Rufus Roundtree & Da B’More Brass Factory
MC Booze
No BS! Brass Band

2013
Wells Fargo Main Stage
Brittanie Thomas
Bridget Kelly
Kem
iLyAIMY
Krar Collective
Jukebox the Ghost
The Dirty Dozen Brass Band
North Mississippi Allstars
Tosin
Meena Cryle & The Chriss Fillmore Band
Flying Eyes
The Wailers
Festival Stage
Basement Instinct
Sojourne
The Rez
Bill O'Connell & The Latin Jazz Allstars
Reina Williams
The Control
Straight Up Tribal
UllNevaNo
Lafayette Gilchrist & The New Volcanoes
United States Navy Band Country Current
The Booby Traps
Reesa Renee
Greasy Hands
Don Trunk
Sine' Qua Non
Appaloosa
Station North Stage
Baltimore City Public Schools
Leland Palmer
Lazlo Lee & The Motherless Children
J Pope & Funk Friday
Matmos
Victims of Experience
Yellow North
Thee Lexington Arrows
Val Yumm
Allie the Cats
Dead Melotron
Dreamboat Armada
Bad Seed Rising
Wild Honey
Red Sammy

2012
Wells Fargo Stage
Navasha Daya
Brian McKnight
Black Joe Lewis & the Honeybears
Clutch
Dontae Winslow & Winslowdynasty
Easy Star All-Stars
Rebirth Brass Band
Festival Stage
Tom Principato
Donegal X-Press
Julienne Irwin
Café Red Band Howard "Funkyfoot" Brooks Productions 
Maimouna Youssef
Station North Stage
Arbouretum
Big In Japan
Yeveto
Celebration
Egg Babies Orchestra
Caleb Stine

2011
Wells Fargo Stage
Fantasia
Southern Culture On The Skids
G. Love & Special Sauce
Matisyahu
Miguel
Nikka Costa
The Pietasters
The 8 Ohms Band
Carolyn Malachi
The Players Band
The Jon Bailey Band
Can't Hang
Festival Stage
Mosno Al-Moseeki
E Major
Superland Stage Band
Telesma
Unity Reggae Band
Pompeii Graffiti
The Kings of Crownsville
The Rise Band
Andy Poxon
The Crawdaddies
Orch Kids
The Band Belief
Larry Brown Quartet
Big Daddy Stallings
Urbanite Stage
Baltimore City Public Schools Showcase
Strings and Things
Matt Wigler
Lee Pearson
Bottle of Blues
Eric Byrd Trio
Turn Around Norman
Love Craft
Kevin Driscoll
Time Out
Blues Society
Community Groove
Tom Williams Quintet.

2010
Wells Fargo Stage
Gov't Mule
Jackie Greene
Cold War Kids
Musiq Soulchild
Wale
Maysa Matarazzo
Rebelution
Charm City Stage
Toubab Krewe
Sahffi
Breaking Reign
Urbanite Stage
Eric Kennedy Quartet
Jump Street
Michael Raitzyk Trio
Festival Stage
Fools & Horses
Higher Hands
Mambo Combo

2009
Robin Thicke
Cake
Dionne Warwick
Robert Randolph & The Family Band
River City Extension
Electrik Red
Faction
Lafayette Gilchrist
Ms. Sara & The Help
Beat Box
No Second Troy
Basshound
Ellen Cherry
Tim Warfield
Los Reyes Del Ko
Higher Hands
The Drakes
Gaybomb
Lo Moda
The Polygons
Pie Boys Flat
Noble Lake
Fall Back Plan
Tia Dae
Balti Mare
Jason Dove
Nickodemus & Quantic Sun People
Neal Conway
David Andrew Smith
Matt Wigler
Deja Belle
April Sampe
Todd Marcus
Needle Gun
Salamander Wool
Dave Fell
Wolf Pac
The Quartet Offensive
Matt Davignon
Todd Marcus Jazz Orchestra
Cold Spring Jazz Quartet
Bay Jazz Project
The Dave Tieff Band
Il Culo

2008
Roberta Flack
Ne-Yo
The Wailers
Rusted Root
Joan Jett & The Blackhearts
Gary B & the Notions
Thrushes
The Oranges Band
Mike Doughty

2007
Main Stage
The Isley Brothers
Los Lonely Boys
Lupe Fiasco
Keyshia Cole
Ryan Shaw
Burning Spear
Sam Bush
Nuttin' But Stringz
Shaw
Festival Stage
Old 97's
University of Baltimore Stage
Damsels
Soul'd Out
Wendy McIntyre
Fools & Horses
DJ Culture stage
DJ Vadim
Karizma
Tittsworth
Pase Rock
Uncle Jesse
DJ Sabo with Nappy G
DJ Ulken with Shanta Live
DJ Impulse

2006
Common
Brazilian Girls
Grace Potter & The Nocturnals
Michael Franti
Citizen Cope
Randy Travis
Jarflys

2005
Morris Day and the Time
Boyz II Men
Q-Tip
Shaggy
Drive-By Truckers
The Disco Biscuits
Platinum Pied Pipers
Danielia Cotton
The Seldon Plan
Swingin' Swamis

2004
Isaac Hayes
Wyclef Jean
Tortured Soul
De La Soul
Arrested Development

2003
Blues Traveler
The Radiators
The Bridge

2001
Karl Denson's Tiny Universe
The North Mississippi Allstars
Railroad Earth
Etta James
Ray Charles
Junkyard Saints
Carl Filipiak
Shemekia Copeland
Smokey Robinson
Junior Brown

2000
 Patti LaBelle
 O'Malley's March
 The Neville Brothers
 Tito Puente
 Dave Brubeck

1999
 Ashford & Simpson with poet Maya Angelou
 Earl Klugh
 The Temptations
 Duke Ellington Orchestra
 Dionne Warwick
 The Disco Biscuits

1998
 Roger Daltrey and the British Rock Symphony and Choir
 Gladys Knight
 Buckwheat Zydeco
 Bela Fleck and the Flecktones

1997
 Patti LaBelle
 KoKo Taylor
 Tito Puente
 Kelly Bell Band

1995
 Ethel Ennis

1994
 Aretha Franklin

1993
 Chaka Khan
 Ruben Blades (con Son Del Solar)

1992
 Gladys Knight
 Tammy Wynette

1991
 Jeffrey Osborne
 Emmylou Harris
 Hiroshima

1990
 Letitia Leigh
 Roberta Flack
 Chick Corea
 Buckwheat Zydeco
 Bela Fleck and the Flecktones

1989
 Martha Reeves and the Vandellas
 Grover Washington, Jr.
 Max Roach Quartet

1987
 Deanna Bogart
 Leon Redbone

1986
 The Chiffons
 Joan Baez
 Boys Choir of Harlem

1985
 Spyro Gyra
 Bo Diddley

1984
 Duke Ellington Orchestra
 Morgan State University Choir
 Wynton Marsalis Quintet
 Sweet Honey in the Rock

1983
 Taj Mahal

1982
 Baltimore Symphony Orchestra
 Ray Charles
 Ethel Ennis

References

External links
 Official homepage
 The annual Foodscape Show was a parody art exhibition that ran during more than 30 years of Artscape festivals.

Art festivals in the United States
Festivals in Baltimore